Always Mine may refer to:
 "Always Mine" (Selena song)
 "Always Mine", a song by the Morning After Girls from Shadows Evolve
 "Always Mine", a song by Brand Nubian from Fire in the Hole